Ekaterina Baturina may refer to:

Ekaterina Baturina (gymnast) (born 1997), Russian artistic gymnast
Ekaterina Baturina (luger) (born 1992), Russian luge competitor